The Revolutionary Workers' Party of the Philippines (RPM-P) is a communist party that split from the Communist Party of the Philippines during the Second Great Rectification Movement.

History

The party was formed in 1995 following a split from the Communist Party of the Philippines due to ideological differences such as rejection of Maoism and preference for the act of insurrection over the Maoist protracted people's war.

The party, as well as its armed group Revolutionary Proletarian Army – Alex Boncayao Brigade, is known to be a "rejectionist" faction of the CPP-New People's Army due to its ideological differences from the latter, especially during the expulsion of 10,000 members from 1992 to 1993, the expulsion of former CPP member Rómulo Tabara, as well as the ex-secretary of the CPP's Metro Manila-Rizal Committee Filemón "Popoy" Lagmán. These events during the "Second Great Rectification Movement" led by the CPP forced the faction to form a separate party in 1995. Following ideological summits with the MR, CMR, Negros, Panay and Samar in October 1995, the protracted people's war was virtually rejected.

Today, the party continues to engage in the parliamentary struggle; they however remain unrecognized by both the Philippine government and the Communist Party of the Philippines.

Splinter group
The party's Mindanao branch broke off in 2001 after disagreement with the national leadership during the peace talks with the national government. The Revolutionary Workers' Party - Mindanao (RPM-M) has been the Philippine section of the Fourth International since 2003.

See also 
 Communist armed conflicts in the Philippines

References 

Banned communist parties
Communist militant groups
Communist parties in the Philippines
Left-wing militant groups in the Philippines
Political parties established in 1995
Rebel groups in the Philippines